State Highway 207 (SH 207) is a state Highway that runs from Post, Texas through the South Plains and Texas Panhandle to the Texas/Oklahoma state line.

History
The highway was originally designated on July 31, 1934 between Floydada and Ralls. By 1939, the designation was extended north to Silverton and south to Garden City. On August 1, 1938, a section from Post to Garden City was designated, creating a gap. On October 24, 1938, the section from Ralls to Post was added, closing the gap. On February 21, 1939, SH 207 was extended north to Silverton. On August 27, 1940, the section of SH 207 from Big Spring to Garden City was cancelled. On February 4, 1941, the section of SH 207 from Gail to 8 miles north of Big Spring was cancelled. on March 6, 1941, the section of SH 207 from 8 miles north of Big Spring to Big Spring and the section of SH 207 from Post to Gail was cancelled. On February 28, 1945, the section of SH 207 from Ralls to Post was cancelled and transferred to FM 122. On October 10, 1947, the section of SH 207 from Ralls to Floydada was transferred to US 62, leaving only the section between Silverton and Floydada. On September 1, 1965, the route was extended north and south along its current route, replacing FM 122 south to Post, the portion of FM 284 north to Claude, a portion of the rerouted SH 15 to Sperman, and SH 282 to the Oklahoma border.

Junction list

Gallery

See also

 Caprock Escarpment
 Duffy's Peak
 Farm to Market Road 400
 Farm to Market Road 669
 Hamblen Drive
 Mount Blanco
 Mushaway Peak
 Salt Fork Brazos River
 White River (Texas)

References

External links

207
Transportation in Garza County, Texas
Transportation in Crosby County, Texas
Transportation in Floyd County, Texas
Transportation in Briscoe County, Texas
Transportation in Armstrong County, Texas
Transportation in Carson County, Texas
Transportation in Hutchinson County, Texas
Transportation in Hansford County, Texas